Ronald Gary Kinchen (January 13, 1941 – August 17, 2011) was an American football player and coach. He served as the head football coach at Nicholls State University from 1972 to 1973, compiling a record of 5–17.

Playing career
Kinchen was an alumnus of the Louisiana State University (LSU), where he played college football as a center and lettered for the LSU Tigers from 1960 to 1962.

Coaching career

High School career
Kinchen was an assistant coach at Glen Oaks High School in Baton Rouge, Louisiana from 1963 to 1964 and head coach in 1965.

College career
In 1966, Kinchen began his college coaching career as an assistant at the University of Southwestern Louisiana. From 1967 to 1968, he was an assistant at Tulane University. Starting in 1969 through 1970, Kinchen was offensive line/defensive line coach at Rice University

In 1972, Kinchen was named the first head football coach at Nicholls State University. He coached through the 1973 season and finished with a record of 5–17 at Nicholls State.

Head coaching record

College

References

External links
 

1941 births
2011 deaths
American football centers
Louisiana Ragin' Cajuns football coaches
LSU Tigers football players
Nicholls Colonels football coaches
Rice Owls football coaches
Tulane Green Wave football coaches
High school football coaches in Louisiana
People from Livingston Parish, Louisiana
Coaches of American football from Louisiana
Players of American football from Baton Rouge, Louisiana